SS Joseph M. Medill was a Liberty ship built in the United States during World War II. She was named after Joseph M. Medill, the co-owner and managing editor of the Chicago Tribune, and  Mayor of Chicago after the great fire of 1871.

Construction
Joseph M. Medill was laid down on 28 September 1942, under a Maritime Commission (MARCOM) contract, MC hull 1523, by J.A. Jones Construction, Panama City, Florida; sponsored by Mrs. Ellen Pearson, the great-granddaughter of the namesake, she was launched on 3 May 1943.

History
She was allocated to the Moore-McCormack Lines, Inc., on 31 May 1943. On 20 January 1948, she was laid up in the National Defense Reserve Fleet, in Wilmington, North Carolina. On 19 February 1960, she was sold for $70,161, to Bethlehem Steel, for scrapping. She was removed from the fleet on 21 April 1960.

References

Bibliography

 
 
 
 

 

Liberty ships
Ships built in Panama City, Florida
1943 ships
Wilmington Reserve Fleet